Maciej Zajder (born 31 January 1988) is a Polish volleyball player. At the professional club level, he plays for the Polish team, Stal Nysa, PlusLiga.

Career

Clubs
Zajder is an alumnus of Skra Bełchatów. From 2011 to 2013, he was a player of AZS Politechnika Warszawska.

National team
In 2013 he won, a silver medal of the 2013 Summer Universiade held in Kazan.

Sporting achievements

Clubs
 CEV Challenge Cup
  2011/2012 – with AZS Politechnika Warszawska

Universiade
 2013  Summer Universiade

References

External links
 
 Player profile at PlusLiga.pl
 Player profile at Volleybox.net

1988 births
Living people
People from Łask
Sportspeople from Łódź Voivodeship
Polish men's volleyball players
Universiade medalists in volleyball
Universiade silver medalists for Poland
Medalists at the 2013 Summer Universiade
Projekt Warsaw players
Trefl Gdańsk players
AZS Olsztyn players
Warta Zawiercie players
Stal Nysa players
Middle blockers